Legal Wives is a 2021 Philippine television drama romance series broadcast by GMA Network. Directed by Zig Dulay, it stars Dennis Trillo, Alice Dixson, Andrea Torres and Bianca Umali. It premiered on July 26, 2021 on the network's Telebabad line up. The series concluded on November 12, 2021 with a total of 80 episodes. It was replaced by I Left My Heart in Sorsogon in its timeslot.

The series was streaming online in Netflix.

Cast and characters

Lead cast
 Dennis Trillo as Ismael Makadatu, a Maranao Muslim who has three wives.
 Alice Dixson as Amirah Alonte, the first wife of Ismael and the widow of Nasser Makadatu.
 Andrea Torres as Diane May F. San Luis-Makadatu, the second wife of Ismael and a Christian.
 Bianca Umali as Farrah Valeandong, the third wife of Ismael and Abdul Malik's daughter.

Supporting cast
 Derrick Monasterio as Edgar Delos Reyes
 Ashley Ortega as Marriam Pabil-Delos Reyes
 Al Tantay as Haseeb Makadatu, a Imam and Nasser and Ismael's father
 Juan Rodrigo as Cesar San Luis, Diane's father who is against the relationship of her daughter with Ismael.
 Irma Adlawan as Nuriya Baunto, Haseeb Makadatu's first wife and Nasser's mother
 Maricar de Mesa as Zobaida Almahdi, Farrah's mother and Abdul Malik's wife
 Tommy Abuel as Asad Ampang Alonte, Amirah's father and a sultan
 Bernard Palanca as Abdul Malik Valeandong, Farrah's father, Zobaida's husband.
 Cherie Gil as Zaina Guimba, Haseeb's second wife and mother of Ismael.
 Abdul Raman as Hammad Pabil
 Mon Confiado as Usman Pabil, the mayor of Lanao del Sur and Marriam's father.
 Shayne Sava as Jamilah Makadatu, Nasser and Amirah's daughter
 Kevin Santos as Omar Delos Reyes
 Divine Aucina as Lizzie Cruz, Diane's friend.
 Chanel LaTorre as Faizah Almahdi, Ismael's cousin.
 Shiela Marie Rodriguez as Kadi Aisha
 Raquel Pareño as Rose Aguila
 Melbelline Caluag as Ailyn Roxas
 Kiko Matos as Ghazi Pabil
 Jay Arcilla as Vince Alvarez
 Brent Valdez as Dale Vasquez

Guest cast
 Alfred Vargas as Naseer Makadatu, son of Haseeb.
 Marx Topacio as Amparo

Production
Legal Wives features a story of a Maranao Muslim royalty and his relationship with his three wives.

Actress Megan Young was initially hired for the role of Diane San Luis. In November 2020, Young left the series due to the production's lock-in filming. She was replaced by Andrea Torres. Principal photography commenced on December 1, 2020. In May 2021, actress Cherie Gil left the series due to personal reasons.

Ratings
According to AGB Nielsen Philippines' Nationwide Urban Television Audience Measurement People in television homes, the pilot episode of Legal Wives earned an 11.9% rating. While the final episode scored a 15.7% rating.

References

External links
 
 

2021 Philippine television series debuts
2021 Philippine television series endings
Filipino-language television shows
GMA Network drama series
Moro people
Philippine romance television series
Television series about Islam
Television shows set in the Philippines
Works about polygamy